FC Baník Ostrava is a Czech women's football team from Ostrava, representing FC Baník Ostrava in the Czech Women's First League. It was founded in 2010.

During their first season, the club played its home matches at Stadion v Ludgeřovicích in Ludgeřovice, however in 2011 the club moved to the pitch of non-league side Odra Petřkovice.

Current squad

References

Women's football clubs in the Czech Republic
Association football clubs established in 2010
 
2010 establishments in the Czech Republic